Gazeh Shahnavazi (also Romanized as Gazeh Shahnavāzī) is a village in Poshtkuh Rural District, in the Central District of Khash County, Sistan and Baluchestan Province, Iran. At the 2006 census, its population was 51, in 10 families.

References 

Populated places in Khash County